Todd Louiso (born January 27, 1970) is an American film actor and film director best known for his role as timid record store clerk Dick in High Fidelity, opposite Jack Black and John Cusack.

Career
Louiso directed his first film in 2002, the acclaimed Love Liza with Philip Seymour Hoffman. He has had supporting roles in films like The Rock, Apollo 13, Jerry Maguire, Scent of a Woman and Thank You for Smoking.

In 2012, his film Hello I Must Be Going was selected as the opening night film of the Sundance Film Festival. His adaptation of Macbeth, written along with his brother-in-law Jacob Koskoff, was released in 2015 as a feature film starring Michael Fassbender and Marion Cotillard.

Personal life
Louiso is married to screenwriter Sarah Koskoff, who wrote the script for Hello I Must Be Going.

Filmography

References

External links

1970 births
Male actors from Cincinnati
American male film actors
American film directors
Living people